Haggraben is a small river of Bavaria, Germany. It flows into the Forchbach in Karlstein am Main.

See also
List of rivers of Bavaria

Rivers of Bavaria
Rivers of the Spessart
Rivers of Germany